Zion (Sion) Rajamim Levy (pronounced Ṣiyyon Raḥamim Levi) (1925–2008) was the Sephardic Chief Rabbi of Panama for 57 years. His tenure is thought to be the longest of any religious leader in the region. He built up a Jewish community of 6,000-7,000 Torah-observant Jews in a country of 3 million.

Early life
Levy was born in Jerusalem shortly after his parents immigrated to Israel from Morocco. His father was Rabbi Yaakov Levy, a noted kabbalist at Beit El Yeshiva. Levy studied at Porat Yosef Yeshiva.

As Chief Rabbi
He arrived in Panama in 1951 at the urging of the Jerusalem beth din.

The Rabbi performed many religious tasks while the community was beginning to expand. Some of his work included: officiating Jewish marriages, authorizing Kosher foods, slaughtering animals under the proper Jewish regulations, conducting Jewish circumcisions (Brit Milah), and writing Sifrei Torah and Mezuzot. Overall, Rabbi Levy did most of the work by himself.

Levy built up the Shevet Ahim Congregation and community in Panama. To prevent power struggles between community factions and himself, Levy established himself as the sole Torah authority. He also laid down the conversion law immediately: No conversions will be performed in Panama, ruling that all converts must undergo conversions in Orthodox rabbinical courts outside Panama and then be subject to a two-year probation period in Panama, where they would have to prove their commitment to a Torah lifestyle.

In his later years, Levy oversaw the construction of new synagogues in Panama City and worked to smooth relations with the country’s Arab and Muslim communities. He frequently phoned the country’s imam for a talk.

By the time of his death, the Shevet Ahim community numbered 10,000 Jews, 6,000 of whom are Torah-observant. The community included several synagogues, mikvahs, three Jewish schools, a yeshiva, a kollel, and a girls' seminary, along with several kosher butchers.

Death

Levy suffered from ill health for several years. In October 2008, he felt unwell and was visited by two physicians from Israel's Tel Hashomer Hospital. The doctors found him in critical condition and recommended that he be flown to Israel to Tel Hashomer. His condition improved initially, but on the evening of 23 November 2008 he succumbed to his illness at the age of 83. He was eulogized at Porat Yosef Yeshiva.

Levy was survived by his sons, David and Haim Levy. His wife, Rubissa Sarah Levy, died shortly after Zion Levy's Death. Haim Levy, a resident of Jerusalem, took over his father's post in Panama as Chief Rabbi. He later resigned the post, and returned to Israel.

References

1925 births
2008 deaths
20th-century rabbis
21st-century rabbis
Panamanian Sephardi Jews
People from Jerusalem
Burials at Har HaMenuchot
Israeli people of Moroccan-Jewish descent
Panamanian people of Israeli descent
Panamanian people of Moroccan-Jewish descent
Israeli Sephardi Jews
Panamanian religious leaders
Mohels